Nuugaatsiaq (old spelling: Nûgâtsiaq) is a settlement in the Avannaata municipality, in northwestern Greenland, located on an island off the southern coast of Sigguup Nunaa peninsula, in the Uummannaq Fjord basin. It had 84 inhabitants in 2010.

History 
On 17 June 2017, a landslide measuring  fell about  into the Karrak fiord, causing a tsunami that hit Nuugaatsiaq. Four people were killed, nine injured and eleven buildings were washed into the water. Initially it was unclear if the landslide was caused by a small earthquake (magnitude 4), but later it was confirmed that the landslide had caused the tremors. The town was largely abandoned following the tsunami.

Transport 

Air Greenland serves the village as part of government contract, with mostly cargo helicopter flights from Nuugaatsiaq Heliport to Illorsuit and Uummannaq.

Royal Arctic Line also serves the village by ship.  This sea link connects Nuugaatsiaq, and other villages on Uummannaq Fjord to Aasiaat.

Population 
The population of Nuugaatsiaq has dropped by over 16 percent relative to the 2000 levels, reflecting a general trend in the region. A November 2015 edition of National Geographic reported about 80 inhabitants, with many houses in the village empty.

References 

Populated places in Greenland
Populated places of Arctic Greenland
Uummannaq Fjord